Anders Jonell (born 20 February 1973) is a Swedish freestyle skier. He competed in the men's moguls event at the 1994 Winter Olympics.

References

External links
 

1973 births
Living people
Swedish male freestyle skiers
Olympic freestyle skiers of Sweden
Freestyle skiers at the 1994 Winter Olympics
People from Skövde Municipality
Sportspeople from Västra Götaland County